The Flora of Nepal is one of the richest in the world due to the diverse climate, topology and geography of the country. Research undertaken in the late 1970s and early 1980s documented 5067 species of which 5041 were angiosperms and the remaining 26 species were gymnosperms. The Terai area has hardwood, bamboo, palm, and sal trees. Notable plants include the garden angelica, Luculia gratissima, Meconopsis villosa, and Persicaria affinis. However, according to ICOMOS checklist (as of 2006), in the protected sites, there are 2,532 species of vascular plants under 1,034 genera and 199 families. The variation in figures is attributed to inadequate floral coverage filed studies.

There are 400 species of vascular plants which are endemic to Nepal. Of these, two in particular are orchids Pleione coronaria and Oreorchis porphyranthes. The most popular endemic plant of Nepal is rhododendron (arboreum) which in Nepali language is called lali guras.

See also
 Fauna of Nepal
 Wildlife of Nepal

References

External links

Plants of Nepal by Nepal Tourism Board
Flora of Nepal at official cite of Ministry of Forests and Environment. Department of Plant Resources. National Herbarium and Plant Laboratories of Nepal.

Flora of Nepal